Sinojackia is a genus of five to eight species of flowering plants in the family Styracaceae, all endemic to China.

The species are deciduous shrubs or small trees growing to 4–12 m tall.

During a presentation on Chinese plant species at Chiba University's Dept. Of Horticulture on October 27, 2017, botanist Mikinori Ogisu informed the audience that less than 20 Sinojackia sarcocarpa remain in the wild. He also said he had walked in the mountains with a local and found the species.

Species
 Sinojackia dolichocarpa C.J.Qi
 Sinojackia henryi (Dummer) Merrill
 Sinojackia huangmeiensis J.W.Ge & X.H.Yao
 Sinojackia microcarpa C.T.Chen & G.Y.Li
 Sinojackia oblongicarpa C.T.Chen & T.R.Cao
 Sinojackia rehderiana Hu
 Sinojackia sarcocarpa L.Q.Lou
 Sinojackia xylocarpa Hu

References

 
Ericales genera
Taxonomy articles created by Polbot